Recoleta  may refer to:

Recoleta, Argentina, suburb of Buenos Aires, Argentina
La Recoleta Cemetery, cemetery in the above commune
Recoleta, Asunción, neighborhood of Asunción, Paraguay
Recoleta Cemetery, Asuncion, cemetery in Paraguay
Recoleta, Chile, commune in Santiago, Chile
Deportes Recoleta, an association football club
Recoleta (Charlottesville, Virginia), United States, a historic home

See also
, a school in Peru
Iglesia de la Recoleta (Peru), in Cuzco
Deportivo Recoleta, a football club of Asunción (Paraguay)